CFJS may refer to:
 Canadian Federation of Jewish Students
 Chicago Futabakai Japanese School